Weiner School District or Weiner Public Schools was a school district headquartered in Weiner, Arkansas, United States. It operated Weiner Elementary School and Weiner High School.

History
By 2010 the student population of the Weiner district had fallen below 350, which required the district to be merged into another district under Arkansas law. Delight instead ultimately merged with the Murfreesboro School District to form the South Pike County School District.

On July 1, 2010, the Weiner district consolidated into the Harrisburg School District.

References

Further reading

 (Download) - Includes boundaries of the Weiner District

External links
 

2010 disestablishments in Arkansas
School districts disestablished in 2010
Defunct school districts in Arkansas
Education in Poinsett County, Arkansas